In 2012 in Quebec, there were 82 covered bridges down from more than 1,200 in the early 1900s.

Existing bridges
All bridges are single span, and single lane, unless noted. All are of the construction type Quebec modified Town lattice unless noted. Some are registered with the Department Cultural Heritage (CPCQ) of the Ministry of Culture and Communications.

Defunct bridges

References

External links
Quebec Covered Bridges List

Quebec